Dychophyiini is a tribe of beetles in the subfamily Cerambycinae, containing the following genera:

 Allodemus Zajciw, 1962
 Alloesia Chevrolat, 1862
 Amoaba Napp & Martins, 2006
 Aridaeus Thomson, 1860
 Callideriphus Blanchard in Gay, 1851
 Championa Bates, 1880
 Chrysoprasis Audinet-Serville, 1834
 Cremys Pascoe, 1867
 Eriphosoma Melzer, 1922
 Eryphus Perty, 1832
 Erythrochiton Zajciw, 1957
 Erythropterus Melzer, 1934
 Eupempelus Bates, 1870
 Homogenes Thomson in Chevrolat, 1862
 Mallosoma Audinet-Serville, 1834
 Monnecles Napp & Santos, 1999
 Neopoeciloderma Monné & Martins, 1981
 Plectrocerum Dejean, 1835
 Poeciloderma White, 1853
 Potisangaba Napp & Martins, 2009
 Pseudothonalmus Guerrero, 2004
 Purpuricenopsis Zajciw, 1968
 Stratone Thomson, 1864
 Tacyba Napp & Martins, 2002
 Tobipuranga Napp & Martins, 1996
 Trichrous Chevrolat, 1858
 Unabiara Napp & Martins, 2002
 Unatara Martins & Napp, 2007

References

Cerambycinae